Valentin Emanoil Bădoi (born 16 December 1975) is a Romanian former football full back, currently a manager. In his career Bădoi played for teams such as FCM Bacău, Rapid București, Steaua București, FC Politehnica Timișoara and Universitatea Craiova.

International career
Valentin Bădoi played 10 games for Romania, making his debut under coach Victor Pițurcă on 9 February 2005, when he came as a substitute and replaced Mirel Rădoi in the 81st minute of a friendly match, which ended 2–2 against Slovakia. His following two games were a 2–0 home victory against Czech Republic and a 1–0 away victory against Finland at the 2006 World Cup qualifiers. Bădoi's last appearance for the national team was on 16 August 2006 in a friendly against Cyprus which ended with a 2–0 victory.

Career statistics

International

Honours

Player
Rulmentul Alexandria
Divizia C: 1997–98
Rapid București
Divizia A: 2002–03
Cupa României: 2005–06, 2006–07
Supercupa României: 2002, 2003 
Politehnica Timișoara
Cupa României runner-up: 2009
Sporting Turnu Măgurele
Liga IV – Teleorman County: 2014–15

Coach
FC Clinceni
Liga III: 2011–12
Sporting Turnu Măgurele
Liga IV – Teleorman County: 2014–15
Carmen București
Liga IV – Bucharest: 2018–19

References

1975 births
Living people
People from Turnu Măgurele
Romanian footballers
Romania international footballers
Association football midfielders
Liga I players
Liga II players
Liga III players
Liga II managers
FCM Bacău players
FC Politehnica Timișoara players
FC Steaua București players
FC Rapid București players
FC U Craiova 1948 players
FC Brașov (1936) players
Romanian football managers
LPS HD Clinceni managers